The Australian cricket team toured Sri Lanka from 18 July to 9 September 2016 to play three Test matches, five One Day Internationals (ODIs), two Twenty20 Internationals (T20Is) matches and a first-class practice match. The Test series was played for Warne–Muralitharan Trophy, with Sri Lanka winning 3–0, their first ever series whitewash against Australia. As a result, Australia slipped from first to third in the ICC Test Championship; Sri Lanka, who had started the series ranked seventh, moved up to sixth.

In August 2016, Sri Lankan batsman Tillakaratne Dilshan announced that he would retire from both ODI and T20I cricket at the end of the series. He retired from all international cricket on 9 September 2016.

On 6 September 2016, Australia recorded the highest ever Twenty20 International score of 263/3 in first T20I of the series. Australia won the ODI series 4–1 and the T20I series 2–0.

Squads

With injury concerns, the Sri Lankan selectors picked their Test squads on a match-by-match basis. Stephen O'Keefe suffered a hamstring injury during the first Test and was replaced by Jon Holland. Travis Head was added to Australia's limited overs squads in August.

Following the conclusion of the second ODI match, Australian captain Steve Smith went home to rest, with David Warner captaining the side for the remaining fixtures of the tour. Nathan Coulter-Nile was ruled out of the last three ODI matches the series due to an injury to his lower back. Shaun Marsh broke his finger in the third ODI and was ruled out of the rest of the series. Aaron Finch was ruled out of the T20I series after fracturing his right index finger while fielding a ball during the fifth ODI and Chris Lynn was ruled out due to dislocating his left shoulder while practicing. Matthew Wade and George Bailey, who were not initially included in the T20I series, were selected as replacements.

Nuwan Pradeep was ruled out of Sri Lanka's ODI squad with a hamstring injury and was replaced with Angelo Perera. Sachith Pathirana replaced Tillakaratne Dilshan, who retired after the 3rd ODI. Angelo Mathews was ruled out of the 5th ODI and the T20I series due to injury. Sri Lanka also released Thisara Perera and Lakshan Sandakan for the final ODI game. The three players were replaced by Upul Tharanga, Niroshan Dickwella and Dasun Shanaka. Dinesh Chandimal stood as captain in the 5th ODI.

Tour match

First-class: Sri Lankan XI vs Australia

Test series

1st Test

2nd Test

3rd Test

ODI series

1st ODI

2nd ODI

3rd ODI

4th ODI

5th ODI

T20I series

1st T20I

2nd T20I

Notes

References

External links
 Series home at ESPN Cricinfo

2016 in Australian cricket
2016 in Sri Lankan cricket
International cricket competitions in 2016
Australian cricket tours of Sri Lanka